Quiet Nights  may refer to:

 Quiet Nights (Diana Krall album), 2009
 Quiet Nights (Django Bates album), 1998
 Quiet Nights (Miles Davis and Gil Evans album), 1964

See also
 Quiet Night (disambiguation)
 Corcovado (song), called "Quiet Nights of Quiet Stars" in English